Francis Burke, or de Burgo, or de Burgh (died August or September 1723) was an Irish Roman Catholic clergyman who served as Archbishop of Tuam (1713–1723).

Career 
Burke was appointed Coadjutor Archbishop of Tuam on 22 August 1713. He had been recommended by John Burke, 9th Earl of Clanricarde, his kinsman. Two months later, he succeeded as Archbishop of Tuam on 31 October 1713, and consecrated on 4 April 1714. He died in office in August or September 1723.

References

1723 deaths
House of Burgh
Roman Catholic archbishops of Tuam
People from County Galway
Year of birth unknown